Mali Rhys Harries (born 6 July 1976) is a Welsh television actress and presenter who has been in the television industry since 1989. She has appeared in several well-established TV series in Welsh and English, including Hinterland, The Indian Doctor and Pobol y Cwm.

Career
Born in Cardiff, Harries attended Ysgol Gyfun Gymraeg Glantaf and graduated from the Bristol Old Vic Theatre School.

She is married to actor Matthew Gravelle. She appeared alongside Gravelle in Baker Boys; each is married to another character in the series. They appear as husband and wife in the S4C drama Un Bore Mercher in 2017, which aired on BBC One in 2018 in an English-language version as Keeping Faith.

In 2010, she was nominated for a BAFTA Cymru award for Best Actress in the Welsh language TV drama, Caerdydd.

Between 2013 and 2016, Harries won critical acclaim as a star in the detective series Y Gwyll (titled Hinterland in English), the first bilingual Welsh-English series to air on the BBC.

In 2014, Harries was voted into the top 10 of the Wales Online "Sexiest Woman in Wales" poll.

Recently Harries has become known for her work with S4C, including the first series of Keeping Faith, her own crime documentary series Y Ditectif and long-running soap Pobol y Cwm.

Filmography

Film

Television

Radio

References

External links
 
 S4C Caerdydd

1976 births
Living people
Welsh television actresses
Welsh soap opera actresses
Welsh film actresses
Welsh-speaking actors
Actresses from Cardiff